Ibolya Verebics (born in 1962 in Győr) is a Hungarian soprano. Since 1986, she has been a member of the Hungarian State Opera.

References

1962 births
Living people
20th-century Hungarian women opera singers
Operatic mezzo-sopranos
People from Győr